Geng Xiaofeng (born 15 October 1987) is a Chinese footballer who currently plays for Chengdu Rongcheng in the Chinese Super League.

Club career
Geng Xiaofeng joined Shandong Luneng's youth academy at the age of 14 in 2001 and would go on to join their first team when then manager Ljubiša Tumbaković promoted him to act as backup for Li Leilei and then later for Yang Cheng. After several seasons at the club, he did not make an appearance for Shandong until the 2012 league season when on 30 March 2012 in a 1-0 win against Qingdao Jonoon, then manager Henk ten Cate decided to replace Yang, who had made several mistakes in club's first two matches, with Geng whose debut for the club saw him have an outstanding performance. Geng remained as the club's first-choice goalkeeper for the rest of the 2012 season and the 2013 season.

On 24 February 2014, Geng was loaned to fellow Chinese Super League side Shanghai Shenhua until the end of 2014 season. He made his debut for the club on 9 March 2014 in a 2-0 win against Shanghai Shenxin. On 29 December 2014, Geng signed with Shanghai on a permanent transfer. He became the second choice goalkeeper in the 2016 season after Li Shuai joined the club.

In February 2017, Geng moved to fellow Super League side Hebei China Fortune on a five-year contract, but would spend 2017 season in reserve squad of Hebei club due to lack of transfer quota. On 27 October 2018, he made his debut for the club in a 3–2 home win over Dalian Yifang. Geng would struggle to establish himself as the clubs first choice goalkeeper within the team and would be loaned our to second tier clubs Inner Mongolia Zhongyou and then Wuhan Three Towns where he would actually win the division title as well as promotion for the club at the end of the 2021 China League One campaign.

On 24 April 2022, Geng joined newly promoted club Chengdu Rongcheng for the start of the 2022 Chinese Super League season. He would go on to make his debut in a league game on 8 June 2022 against Beijing Guoan, where he came on as a substitute in a 3-2 defeat.

International career
In June 2012, Geng received his first call-up to the Chinese national team for friendlies against Spain and Vietnam. On 15 August 2012, he made his debut for China in a 1-1 draw against Ghana, coming on as a substitute for Zeng Cheng in the 74th minute.

Career statistics 
Statistics accurate as of match played 8 January 2023.

Honours

Club
Shandong Luneng
 Chinese Super League: 2006, 2008, 2010
 Chinese FA Cup: 2006

Wuhan Three Towns
China League One: 2021

References

External links

 

1987 births
Living people
Footballers from Shenyang
Association football goalkeepers
Chinese footballers
China international footballers
Shandong Taishan F.C. players
Shanghai Shenhua F.C. players
Hebei F.C. players
Inner Mongolia Zhongyou F.C. players
Chinese Super League players
China League One players
21st-century Chinese people